Anice Badri (born 18 September 1990) is a Tunisian professional footballer who plays as a forward for Espérance de Tunis.

Club career
Anice Badri spent his childhood in Lyon, his hometown. At the age of 13, he joined the Olympique Lyonnais training center and played for three years in the youth teams of the club. In 2006, he suffered a herniated disc and must stop football for more than a year. He found the ground in 2008 at AS Saint-Priest, where he remained a year under the team under 19 years. He then moved to Monts d'Or Azergues Foot where he joined the first team in July 2010. He only played five matches in CFA2 until September of this year, when he joined Lille OSC, club reserve team. He played for two and a half years, playing 40 games for 9 goals.

On 31 January 2013, Badri was loaned to Royal Mouscron-Péruwelz, a Belgian Second Division team. He is regularly lined up and his loan extended for a season. He became a holder during the 2013–2014 and was an important part in the victory of the club in the final round for the accession to the Belgian First Division A, he scored a goal at each of the last three matches. He is transferred free of charge by Mouscron-Péruwelz on 3 July 2014 and scored a goal for his first match in Belgian First Division A against Anderlecht. He was holder at each match during the first lap but then sees his second half of the season disturbed by minor injuries.

After his unsuccessful career in France and Belgium, he opted to return to his homeland Tunisia, where he joined the Tunisian giant Espérance Sportive de Tunis in a four years contract. Since then, from being unused and forgotten, he rose to prominence, helping the club to win two consecutive CAF Champions League titles for the first time, as well as making the club a formidable force in Tunisia.

International career
Badri was born and raised in France to parents of Tunisian descent. Badri opted to represent the Tunisia national football team, and got his first call-up for a set of AFCON qualifiers against Togo in March 2016. He scored his first goal on 5 September 2017 against DR Congo in Kinshasa at the 79th minute which brought the team closer to qualifying for the World Cup in Russia.

In June 2018 he was named in Tunisia's 23-man squad for the 2018 World Cup in Russia.

Personal life
Badri predominantly speaks French, having been born and raised in France. He also speaks fluent English, but he's not fluent in Arabic.

Career statistics

International

International goals
Scores and results list Tunisia's goal tally first.

References

External links

1990 births
Living people
Footballers from Lyon
Association football forwards
Citizens of Tunisia through descent
Tunisian footballers
Tunisia international footballers
French footballers
French expatriate footballers
Tunisian expatriate footballers
GOAL FC players
Lille OSC players
Royal Excel Mouscron players
Espérance Sportive de Tunis players
Ittihad FC players
Belgian Pro League players
Tunisian Ligue Professionnelle 1 players
Saudi Professional League players
Expatriate footballers in Belgium
Expatriate footballers in Saudi Arabia
Tunisian expatriate sportspeople in Belgium
Tunisian expatriate sportspeople in Saudi Arabia
French sportspeople of Tunisian descent
2018 FIFA World Cup players
2019 Africa Cup of Nations players